Landulf or Landulph, Italian Landolfo and Latin Landolfus, Landulphus, etc., is a masculine given name of Germanic (possibly Lombardic) origin. It may refer to:
Landulf I of Benevento
Landulf II of Benevento
Landulf III of Benevento
Landulf IV of Benevento
Landulf V of Benevento
Landulf VI of Benevento
Landulf I of Capua
Landulf II of Capua
Landulf III of Capua
Landulf IV of Capua
Landulf V of Capua, see Landulf III of Benevento
Landulf VI of Capua, see Landulf IV of Benevento
Landulf VII of Capua
Landulf VIII of Capua
Landulf II (archbishop of Benevento)
Landulf of Carcano
Landulf of Conza
Landulf of Gaeta
Landulf of Milan
Landulf of Yariglia
Landulf Junior
Landolfus Sagax

See also
Landulph, a town in England
Landulfids, a dynasty named after a Landulf
Landolfi, an Italian surname